Ficinia is a genus of tufted or rhizomatous sedges in the family Cyperaceae. There are around 70 recognised species in Africa, four species (Ficinia ambigua, Ficinia anomala, Ficinia nodosa, and Ficinia spiralis) that occur in New Zealand and a single species Ficinia nodosa that occurs in Australia.

References

Cyperaceae
Cyperaceae genera